Colin Kelly is a Gaelic football manager and former player from Drogheda, County Louth. He played for the Louth county team between 1988 and 2002. He is the Wee County’s all-time leading scorer.

He later managed Louth for three years. He led Louth to successive promotions in the National Football League in 2016 and 2017, though Louth did not make any championship impact during his time in charge.

He was appointed Westmeath senior manager on a two-year term in late 2017 but left in mid-2018, citing family commitments.

He was appointed Wicklow senior manager in October 2021. However, he left in March 2022, citing work commitments.

References

External links
Profile at GAAinfo.com (archived)

Year of birth missing (living people)
Living people
Cooley Kickhams Gaelic footballers
Gaelic football forwards
Gaelic football managers
Newtown Blues Gaelic footballers
Louth inter-county Gaelic footballers